Grenloch is an unincorporated community located within Washington Township, Gloucester County, New Jersey, United States. Grenloch has a post office with ZIP code 08032.

Grenloch is Scottish for "green lake".

Demographics

References

Unincorporated communities in Gloucester County, New Jersey
Unincorporated communities in New Jersey